The 1991 Czechoslovak motorcycle Grand Prix was the thirteenth round of the 1991 Grand Prix motorcycle racing season. It took place on the weekend of 23–25 August 1991 at the Masaryk Circuit located in Brno, Czechoslovakia.

500 cc race report
Wayne Rainey on pole, his 6th for the season; Mick Doohan 0.1 seconds behind. Doohan gets the start from Rainey.

Doohan sets the fastest lap on the 8th, and Rainey is still with him. It's a big fight on the last lap, and Rainey gets the best of Doohan.

Rainey on how to beat Doohan: "I'd just sit on his wheel in the middle part of the race, and I'd make sure he could feel me, so he’d have to work his front tire harder, braking later and going deeper into the bends. As the tire got used up, his bike'd start to push and run out wide. Then I'd pass him and up the pace, and he couldn't stay with me."

500 cc classification

References

Czech Republic motorcycle Grand Prix
Czechoslovak
Motorcycle Grand Prix
Czechoslovak motorcycle Grand Prix